The London Naval Conference may refer to:

 The London Naval Conference 1908–1909, which promulgated a declaration on the laws of naval warfare
 The London Naval Conference 1930, which produced the London Naval Treaty
 The London Naval Conference 1935, which produced the Second London Naval Treaty

See also 
 London Conference (disambiguation)
 Treaty of London (disambiguation)